Osvaldo Hernán Rodríguez Musso (26 July 1943 – 18 March 1996) was a Chilean troubadour, poet, and essayist commonly regarded in his country for his waltz song Valparaíso. Similarly, he is known as The Gypsy.

Works

Poetry
1973 – State of Emergency
1975 – Journal of the Double Exile
1994 – Songs of Extramural (foreword by Julio Cortázar)

Prose
With Their Eyes Look Strange (short stories)
The Day You Love Me (novel)

Essays
Singers Who Reflect, Notes for a Personal History of the New Chilean Song

Articles
The American Dream of Patricio Manns
Laughter and Drums Gabriel Parra
Araucaria de Chile

References

1943 births
1996 deaths
Chilean male poets
University of Valparaíso alumni
University of Chile alumni
20th-century Chilean poets
20th-century Chilean male writers